To Yu-ho (1 July 1905 – 1982) was a North Korean archaeologist and member of the Supreme People's Assembly, North Korea's unicameral parliament.

To was born and raised in Hamhǔng. He earned a doctoral degree at Vienna University in Austria in 1935, was perhaps the first Korean archaeologist and among the first Korean academics to have received their training overseas. He married a German woman and returned to North Korea in the late 1940s. Do became a professor at Kim Il Sung University in Py'ǒngyang in 1947 and served as the director of a number of archaeological institutes through the 1960s. He also served in several capacities in the North Korean government, including as a representative in the Supreme People's Assembly in the early 1960s and in the Standing Committee of the Supreme People's Assembly from the mid-1960s.

To was responsible for leading archaeological excavations at North Korean sites such as Kulp'o-ri, Ch'itam-ni, Odong, Allak, Ch'o-do, and Kungsan-ni. To's major monograph, Chosǒn Wonsi Kogohak, laid the groundwork for archaeological research in North Korea from the 1960s through the 1990s.

Selected bibliography
 Chosǒn Wonsi Kogohak [Prehistoric Archaeology of Chosǒn]. Institute of Science Publications, Py'ǒngyang, 1960.
 To, Yu-ho and Ki-dǒk Hwang. Ch'itam-ni Wǒnshi Yuchǒk Palgul Pogǒ [Excavation Report of the Ch'itam-ni Prehistoric Site]. Kwahakwǒn Ch'ulpan'sa, Py'ǒngyang, 1961.

References
 Encyclopædia Britannica Korea article on To Yu-ho 
 Naver Encyclopedia article on To Yu-ho
 Biography of To Yu-ho

See also
Kim Won-yong
Kim Jung-bae
Richard J. Pearson
Choi Mong-lyong
Sim Bong-geun

1905 births
1982 deaths
North Korean archaeologists
North Korean expatriates in Austria
Asian archaeology
Members of the Supreme People's Assembly
People from South Hamgyong
People from Hamhung
20th-century archaeologists